The 1964 United States presidential election in Minnesota took place on November 3, 1964 as part of the 1964 United States presidential election. Voters chose ten electors, or representatives to the Electoral College, who voted for president and vice president.

Minnesota was won by the Democratic Party candidate, incumbent President Lyndon B. Johnson, who had assumed the presidency less than a year earlier following the assassination of John F. Kennedy, won the state over U.S. Senator Barry Goldwater of Arizona by a margin of 431,493 votes, or 27.76%. Johnson went on to win the election nationally, by a landslide margin of 22.58% of the popular vote. Goldwater carried only six states, including his home state of Arizona, together with the five southern states of Alabama, Georgia, Louisiana, Mississippi, and South Carolina.

In the 1964 election, President Johnson carried Minnesota — which tended to favor Republicans prior to the 1974 Watergate Scandal — by a margin of victory that hadn't been seen in a presidential election in the state since Franklin D. Roosevelt carried the state by a margin of 30.83% over Alf Landon in 1936. This margin of victory was aided by the fact that Hubert Humphrey, the state's incumbent US Senator, was on the Democratic ticket for vice president. Nationally, no candidate since James Monroe’s re-election in 1820 had won as great a percentage of the popular vote as did Johnson in 1964, nor has any candidate since 1964.

, this is the last election in which Brown County, Redwood County, and Rock County voted for a Democratic presidential candidate. Olmsted County would not vote Democratic again until 2008.

Results

Results by county

See also
 United States presidential elections in Minnesota

References

1964
Min
1964 Minnesota elections